The Europe/Africa Zone  was one of the three zones of regional Davis Cup competition in 2010.  It was divided into three tiers ("Groups"), and Group III was divided into a European zone and an African zone. Teams in Group III Africa competed for promotion to Group II for 2011.

The Group III Africa tournament was held in the Week commencing May 5, 2010 in Marrakech, Morocco, on outdoor clay courts.

Participating teams

Format
The fourteen teams played in four groups, in round-robin format. Each tie consisted of two singles and one doubles match, each best-of-three sets. The winners of Groups A and B and the winners of Groups C and D then played off for promotion to the Europe/Africa Zone Group II for 2011.

Group A

Results of Individual Ties

Group B

Results of Individual Ties

Group C

Results of Individual Ties

Group D

Results of Individual Ties

Promotion Playoffs

Morocco and Tunisia promoted to Group II for 2011.

5th–6th Playoff

7th–8th Playoff

9th–10th Playoff

11th–12th Playoff

13th–14th Playoff

References

External links
Davis Cup draw details

Africa Zone Group III
Davis Cup Europe/Africa Zone